This article lists political parties in Cuba. Cuba is a single-party authoritarian regime, led by the Communist Party of Cuba, where political opposition is not permitted. No party is allowed to campaign or endorse candidates for election, including the Communist Party. Candidates for National Assembly of People's Power elections are nominated by organs that are firmly controlled by the Party. Candidates are elected on an individual referendum basis without formal party involvement, though elected assemblies predominantly consist of members of the dominant party alongside non-affiliated candidates. Elections in Cuba are neither free, nor democratic. As a result, political rallies by opposition parties occur only sporadically on the island.
 	
Cuban law also stipulates that it is punishable to receive funds from a foreign government for purposes of a political organization.

Current political parties

Official parties 

 Communist Party of Cuba (Partido Comunista de Cuba)

Unofficial parties 
Cuban Libertarian Party - José Martí (Partido Libertario Cubano - José Martí) 
Christian Democratic Party of Cuba (Partido Demócrata Cristiano de Cuba) 
Cuban Democratic Socialist Current (Corriente Socialista Democratica Cubana) 
Cuban Liberal Solidarity Party - An amalgamation of the National Liberal Party and the Democratic Solidarity Party
Cuban Liberal Union (Unión Liberal Cubana, member LI) 
Democratic Social-Revolutionary Party of Cuba (Partido Social-Revolucionario Democrático de Cuba) 
Orthodox Renovation Party (Partido de la Renovación Ortodoxa) 
Social Democratic Co-ordination of Cuba (Coordinadora Social Demócrata de Cuba)

Historical parties

Authentic Party
Democratic Party
Democratic Solidarity Party
Cuban National League
Cuban National Party
Democratic Federal Republican Party of Santiago de Cuba
Democratic Union Party
Independent Republican Party
Liberal Party of Cuba
National Liberal Party of Cuba
Orthodox Party
People's Labour Party
People's Party
Popular Socialist Party
Progressive Action Party
Republican Party of Havana
Socialist Party of the Island of Cuba
Socialist Party of Manzanillo
Socialist Workers Party

See also

 List of political parties by country
 Liberalism in Cuba
 Cuban dissident movement

References

 
Cuba
Political parties
Cuba
Political parties